Alone III: The Pinkerton Years is a compilation album by Weezer singer Rivers Cuomo, released on December 12, 2011. It comprises demos recorded between 1993 and 1996, when Cuomo was studying at Harvard University and writing material for the albums Pinkerton (1996) and the abandoned Songs from the Black Hole. It is the third in Cuomo's Alone series of demo compilations, following Alone (2007) and Alone II (2008).

Alone III was sold exclusively with The Pinkerton Diaries, a book collecting journals, letters, essays and music notation written by Cuomo in the same period.

Reception 
Pitchfork awarded Alone III 7.3 out of 10, writing: "Alone III casts the creative up-ramp to Pinkerton as an inspired if not always productive time for Cuomo - you can practically visualize his brain giddily whirring with a flood of new ideas and classicist ambitions ... if you value these archaeological digs as an opportunity to construct an alternate band history, Alone III is easily Cuomo's most worthwhile project since, well, Pinkerton."

Track listing
All songs written by Rivers Cuomo.

1. "I'm So Lonely"
2. "Getchoo"
3. "Lisa"
4. "Negativland"
5. "You Gave Your Love to Me Softly"
6. "When You're Alone"
7. "Susanne"
8. "There Is No Other One"
9. "Let Me Wash at Your Sink"
10. "Waiting on You"

 Suite from the Black Hole
11. "Oh No, This Is Not For Me"
12. "Tired of Sex"
13. "She's Had a Girl"
14. "What is This I Find?"
15. "Now I Finally See"
16. "Longtime Sunshine"

 Fulton Avenue Suite
17. "I'm Lonely on a Saturday Night"
18. "Oh God I'm Hungry"
19. "I'm on Fire, You're a Liar"
20. "The End of My String"
21. "I Can't Break Your Heart Slow"
22. "Money Makes Me Happy"
23. "My Mind's on You"

 Alone III cont'd.
24. "Defeat on the Hill"
25. "Clarinet Waltz"
26. "A Glorious Moment"

References

External links

2011 compilation albums
Rivers Cuomo albums
Demo albums
Sequel albums